Samuel Mlynarovič (born 23 May 1990) is a Slovak professional ice hockey center who is currently playing for HK Poprad of the Slovak Extraliga.

Career
He had previously played for HC Košice. In the 2014–15 season became a champion of Kazakhstan with Yertis Pavlodar.

Career statistics

Regular season and playoffs

International

References

External links

1990 births
Living people
Sportspeople from Poprad
Slovak ice hockey centres
HK Poprad players
Yertis Pavlodar players
HC '05 Banská Bystrica players
HC Košice players
HK Dukla Michalovce players
JKH GKS Jastrzębie players
Slovak expatriate ice hockey people
Slovak expatriate sportspeople in Poland
Slovak expatriate sportspeople in Kazakhstan
Expatriate ice hockey players in Kazakhstan
Expatriate ice hockey players in Poland